Andrew Weiner may refer to:

 Andrew Weiner (writer) (1949–2019), Canadian writer
 Andrew M. Weiner, American electrical engineer